Acanthobrama terraesanctae, the Kinneret bream or Kinneret bleak, is a species of freshwater fish in the family Cyprinidae. This is a small planktivorous fish, typically about 14 cm long, occurring near surface in large schools. It is very abundant in Lake Tiberias, whereas there is little information on the other lake, which is small (0.5 km2) and can hold a small population anyway.

References

Acanthobrama
Taxa named by Heinz Steinitz
Fish described in 1952
Taxonomy articles created by Polbot
Sea of Galilee
Cyprinid fish of Asia
Freshwater fish of Western Asia
Fish of Israel
Fish of Syria
Taxobox binomials not recognized by IUCN